Ramlal Meena (born 2 December 1984) is a member of the Rajasthan Legislative Assembly from Pratapgarh constituency.

References 

1984 births
Indian National Congress politicians from Rajasthan
Rajasthan MLAs 2018–2023
People from Pratapgarh district, Rajasthan
Living people